Vladimir Ivanovich Trusenyov (3 August 1931 – 2001) was a Russian discus thrower who won a European title in 1962 and placed third in 1958. In 1962 he held a world record for a few weeks. He competed in the 1960 and 1964 Summer Olympics and finished 15th and 8th, respectively.

Trusenyov took up athletics in the mid-1950s and won the Soviet title in 1962, 1964, 1965 and 1966, placing second in 1958 and third in 1957. After retiring from competitions he worked as an athletics coach until 1996.

References

1931 births
2001 deaths
Russian male discus throwers
Soviet male discus throwers
People from Tatarstan
Olympic athletes of the Soviet Union
Athletes (track and field) at the 1960 Summer Olympics
Athletes (track and field) at the 1964 Summer Olympics
World record setters in athletics (track and field)
European Athletics Championships medalists
Burials at Bogoslovskoe Cemetery
Sportspeople from Tatarstan